The Quebec Gay Archives ( or AGQ) is a nonprofit organization dedicated to documenting the history of the gay and lesbian communities of the Canadian province of Quebec.  Founded in 1983 by Jacques Prince and Ross Higgins and located in Montreal,   the AGQ maintains collections of periodicals, newspapers, press clippings, book, videocassettes, DVDs, posters, photos and archival materials. Its collection includes the photographic canon of Alan B. Stone, which reflects the life's work of the notable Montreal "beefcake" photographer.  In 2013, the Quebec Gay Archives moved to expanded premises on rue Atateken in Montreal.

See also

LGBT rights in Canada
Timeline of LGBT history

References

External links
Quebec Gay Archives web site

Archives in Canada
LGBT history in Canada
Studies of Canadian history
1983 establishments in Quebec
Non-profit organizations based in Montreal
LGBT non-profit organizations in Canada
LGBT museums and archives
LGBT culture in Montreal